The 2019 European Cadets Wrestling Championships (U17) was the 22th edition of European Cadets Wrestling Championship of combined events, and took place from June 17 to 23 in Faenza, Italy.

Medal table

Team ranking

Medal overview

Men's freestyle

Men's Greco-Roman

Women's freestyle

References

External links 

Wrestling
European Wrestling Cadet Championships
European Wrestling Cadet Championships